Vembaukum Sadagopacharlu (died 1863) was an Indian lawyer and politician who served as a member of the Madras Legislative Council from 1861 to 1863. He was the first native Indian to serve as a member of the council.

Early life 
Sadagopacharlu hailed from the village of Vembakkam near Kanchipuram. He matriculated from the Presidency College, Madras in 1858 and studied law. Soon, he enrolled himself as a lawyer, and along with his brother V. Rajagopacharlu emerged as one of the first and foremost Indians in the bar making up a fortune in a short time.

Politics 
Sadagopacharlu was nominated to the Madras Legislative Council in 1861 and served until his death in 1863. Gazulu Lakshminarasu Chetty was appointed to fill the seat left by his death.

References 

 
 

1863 deaths
19th-century Indian lawyers
Year of birth missing
Members of the Madras Legislative Council
People from Kanchipuram district